Polarstern Knoll is an undersea knoll named for the German research vessel Polarstern, which took part in 22 expeditions to the Arctic and Antarctic (1982–1995). Name proposed by Dr. Heinrich Hinze, Alfred Wegener Institute for Polar and Marine Research, Bremerhaven, Germany. Name approved 6/97 (ACUF 271).

Hills of Coats Land